Adam Atkinson (born 1967) is a Church of England priest.
2008.

Atkinson was educated at the University of Birmingham. He was ordained priest in 2008. After a curacy in Shadwell he was Vicar of  Bethnal Green for 9 years. He was Mission Director for the Two Cities area from 2019 until his appointment as an Archdeacon.

References

1967 births
Living people
Alumni of the University of Birmingham
21st-century English Anglican priests
Archdeacons of Charing Cross